Euriphene ampedusa, the common brown nymph, is a butterfly in the family Nymphalidae. It is found in Senegal, Guinea-Bissau, Guinea, Sierra Leone, Liberia, Ivory Coast, Ghana, Togo and Nigeria. The habitat consists of forests.

References

Butterflies described in 1866
Euriphene
Butterflies of Africa
Taxa named by William Chapman Hewitson